Norman Cecil Smith (c. 1899 – c. 1971) was a rugby union player who represented Australia.

Smith, a wing, claimed a total of 6 international rugby caps for Australia.

References

Australian rugby union players
Australia international rugby union players
Year of birth uncertain
Rugby union wings